James Keith O'Neill Edwards, DFC (23 March 19207 July 1988) was an English comedy writer and actor on radio and television, best known as Pa Glum in Take It from Here and as headmaster "Professor" James Edwards in Whack-O!.

Early life
Edwards was born in Barnes, Surrey, the son of a professor of mathematics. He had four brothers and four sisters. He was educated at St Paul's Cathedral School, at King's College School in Wimbledon and as a choral scholar at St John's College, Cambridge, where he sang in the college choir.

Second World War
Edwards served in the Royal Air Force during the Second World War, was commissioned in April 1942, was awarded the Distinguished Flying Cross, and ended the war as a flight lieutenant. He served with No. 271 Squadron RAF, based in Doncaster, who took part in the D-Day landings. His Dakota was shot down at Arnhem in 1944, resulting in facial injuries requiring plastic surgery, that he disguised with a large handlebar moustache that became his trademark. His injuries and their restitution made him a member of the Guinea Pig Club.

Acting career

Radio and television
Edwards was a feature of London theatre in post-war years, debuting at London's Windmill Theatre in 1946 and on BBC radio the same year. His early variety act, where he first used the name Professor Jimmy Edwards, was described by Roy Hudd as being "a mixture of university lecture, RAF slang, the playing of various loud wind instruments and old-fashioned attack". Edwards was in the London Laughs revue at the Adelphi Theatre, London from 12 April 1952 - 6 February 1954 with Tony Hancock and Vera Lynn. He had previously performed in the Cambridge Footlights revue. He gained wider exposure as a radio performer in Take It From Here, co-starring Dick Bentley, which first paired his writer Frank Muir with Bentley's script writer, Denis Norden. Also on radio he featured in Jim the Great and My Wildest Dream.

He appeared in Whack-O on television, also written by Muir and Norden, and the radio panel game Does the Team Think?, a series which Edwards created. In 1960 a film of Whack-O called Bottoms Up was written by Muir and Norden. On TV he appeared in The Seven Faces of Jim, Six More Faces of Jim and More Faces of Jim; Make Room for Daddy, Sykes, Bold As Brass, I Object, John Jorrocks Esq, The Auction Game, Jokers Wild, Sir Yellow, Doctor in the House, Charley's Aunt, Brendon Chase and Oh! Sir James! (which he also wrote).

He was the subject of This Is Your Life in 1958 when he was surprised by Eamonn Andrews at the BBC's Piccadilly 1 Studio.

Edwards starred in The Fossett Saga in 1969 as James Fossett, an ambitious Victorian writer of penny dreadfuls, with Sam Kydd playing Herbert Quince, his unpaid manservant, and June Whitfield playing music-hall singer Millie Goswick. This was shown on Fridays at 20:30 on LWT; David Freeman was the creator.

Stage and film
In December 1958, Jimmy Edwards played the King in Rodgers and Hammerstein's Cinderella at the London Coliseum with Kenneth Williams, Tommy Steele, Yana and Betty Marsden; Bobby Howell was the Musical Director.

On 2 April 1966, he played at the last night of Melbourne's Tivoli Theatre. His final words closed a tradition of Australian music hall. "I don't relish the distinction of being the man who closed the Tiv. Music hall's dead in Britain. Now this one's dead, there's nowhere to go. I'll either become a character comedian or a pauper."

Edwards frequently worked with Eric Sykes, acting in short films that Sykes wrote: The Plank (1967), which also starred Tommy Cooper; alongside Arthur Lowe in the remake of The Plank in 1979; and in Rhubarb (1969), which again featured Sykes. The films were not silent but had very little dialogue. He also appeared in The Bed Sitting Room (1969) as Nigel, a man who lives in a left luggage compartment after being mistaken for a suitcase.

Edwards and Sykes toured British theatres with their farce Big Bad Mouse which, while scripted, let them ad lib, involve the audience and break the "fourth wall". The show initially had a six-week run at the Palace Theatre, Manchester during which Edwards and Sykes had followed the script, with these performances greeted with universally poor reviews. Sensing that cancellation was imminent Edwards told Sykes that he intended to "have a bit of fun" with the show and for what was expected to be the last week of the run the two stars began to deviate heavily from the script. However the new, more improvised version proved a success with audiences and led to a long run for the show at the Shaftesbury Theatre.

Sykes was replaced by Roy Castle in later runs in its three-year residency at the Shaftesbury Theatre in London's West End and in tours of the Middle East and Australia. Edwards and Sykes also performed the show for Rhodesian troops at the request of the country's prime minister, Ian Smith, a controversial event at the time. Edwards also starred in the stage revival of Maid of the Mountains.

Personal life
Jimmy Edwards published his autobiography, Six of the Best, in 1984, as a follow-up to Take it From Me. He was vice-president of the City of Oxford Silver Band, and an accomplished player of tuba and euphonium. He was founder and a lifelong member of the Handlebar Club, in which all the members had such moustaches. He played at Ham Polo Club. Roy Plomley interviewed him for Desert Island Discs on 1 August 1951.

Edwards was a lifelong Conservative and in the 1964 general election stood for Paddington North, without success. His candidature drew wide media attention, much of it derisive, although the local party insisted they had chosen "Jimmy Edwards the man" rather than the comedian. As a result of this failed candidature, he took to introducing himself as "Professor James Edwards, MA, Cantab, Failed MP".

He was a devotee of fox hunting at Ringmer, near Lewes. He was Rector of the University of Aberdeen for three years in the 1950s, a university with a history of celebrities and actors as honorary rector.

He was married to Valerie Seymour for 11 years. In 1979, however, he was exposed as a homosexual to his annoyance. After the ending of his marriage, press reports spoke of his engagement to Joan Turner, the actress, singer and comedian, but the reports were suspected to be a mutual publicity stunt. During the 2015 Gold documentary Frankie Howerd: The Lost Tapes Edwards was mentioned by Barry Cryer as one of several performers of the postwar era forced to conceal their homosexuality as a result of prevailing norms. He lived in Fletching, East Sussex and died from pneumonia in London in 1988 at the age of 68.

His home movies are held by the Cinema Museum in London.

Selected filmography
 Trouble in the Air (1948) – B. Barrington Crockett
 Helter Skelter (1949) – Dr James Edwards
 Treasure Hunt (1952) – Hercules Ryall / Sir Roderick Ryall
 Innocents in Paris (1953) – Captain George Stilton
 An Alligator Named Daisy (1955) – Alligator Owner (uncredited)
 Three Men in a Boat (1956) – Harris
 Bottoms Up (1960) – Prof. Jim Edwards
 Nearly a Nasty Accident (1961) – Group Capt. Kingsley
 The Plank (1967) – Policeman
 The Bed Sitting Room (1969) – Nigel
 Rhubarb (1969) – PC Rhubarb

Notes

Further reading

 Anthony Slide. Wake Up at the Back There! It's Jimmy Edwards. BearManor Media, 2018.

External links

 
 
 Jimmy Edwards BBC Comedy Guide

1920 births
1988 deaths
Male actors from London
Alumni of St John's College, Cambridge
English male comedians
English male film actors
English male radio actors
English radio writers
English male stage actors
English male television actors
English gay actors
Gay comedians
English gay writers
People educated at St. Paul's Cathedral School
People from Barnes, London
People educated at King's College School, London
Recipients of the Distinguished Flying Cross (United Kingdom)
Rectors of the University of Aberdeen
Royal Air Force Volunteer Reserve personnel of World War II
20th-century English male actors
Conservative Party (UK) parliamentary candidates
English LGBT politicians
Royal Air Force pilots of World War II
Royal Air Force officers
20th-century English comedians
Members of the Guinea Pig Club
20th-century English male writers
20th-century English LGBT people
British LGBT comedians